The 2005 Shepherd Rams football team represented Shepherd University as a member of the West Virginia Intercollegiate Athletic Conference (WVIAC) during the 2005 NCAA Division II football season. Led by 19th-year head coach Monte Cater, the Rams compiled an overall record of 11–1 with a mark of 8–0 in conference play, winning the WVIAC title.

The Rams played their home games at Ram Stadium in Shepherdstown, West Virginia.

Regular season
Shepherd finished the regular season 11–0.

Playoffs
Shepherd received a first round bye in the playoffs by way of earning the top seed in Super Region I. In the second round, the team hosted , losing 28–21.

Schedule

References

Shepherd
Shepherd Rams football seasons
Shepherd Rams football